Békuy is a department or commune of Tuy Province in southern Burkina Faso. Its capital lies at the town of Békuy.

Towns and villages

References

Departments of Burkina Faso
Tuy Province